Sole is an American alternative hip hop artist based in Denver, Colorado.  His discography consists of eighteen studio albums, four collaboration albums, ten EPs, two mixtapes, three remix albums, three compilations, twelve singles, one audiobook, one DVD, and many guest appearances on other artists' tracks.

Discography

Studio albums

Collaboration albums

EPs

Mixtapes

Remix albums

Compilation albums

Live albums

Singles

Audio books

DVDs

Guest appearances
 Sixtoo - "Cave People" from The Psyche Intangible (1998)
 Themselves - "Lyrical Cougel" from Them (1999)
 Sixtoo - "When Freedom Rings" from Songs I Hate (and Other People Moments) (2001)
 Sage Francis - "I Apologize" from Sick of Waiting Tables (2001)
 Clouddead - "I Promise Never to Get Paint on My Glasses Again (1)" from Clouddead (2001)
 DJ Krush - "Song for John Walker" from The Message at the Depth (2002)
 Bleubird - "Another Super Mario Cart Brothers Drive By" from Sloppy Doctor (2003)
 Pedestrian - "Arrest the President" from Volume One: UnIndian Songs (2005)
 Sage Francis - "My Head" from Still Sickly Business (2005)
 Mr. Nogatco - "Live Dissection" from Nogatco Rd. (2006)
 Scott Da Ros - "Humans Bury Deep" from One Kind of Dead End (2006)
 Noah23 - "Tragic Comedy" from Rock Paper Scissors (2008)
 Skyrider - "Infest" from Skyrider (2008)
 Themselves - "1 for No Money" from The Free Houdini (2009)
 Time - "Trouble with Kids" from Naked Dinner (2010)
 Ceschi - "Long Live the Short Lived" from The One Man Band Broke Up (2010)
 Factor - "Living in a Vacuum" from Lawson Graham (2010)
 Factor - "Don't Jock the Dead" from 13 Stories (2010)
 Kay the Aquanaut - "Kill You" from Waterloo (2011)
 Noah23 - "Murder City" from Fry Cook on Venus (2011)
The Bins - "Inspiration" from Inspiration (2011)
 Kaigen - "Don't Try to Stop It" & "Rust Belt Fellows" from Re: Bloomer (2011)
 K-the-I??? - "The Third Planet" from Synthesthesia (2011)
 Noah23 & Krem - "Darkside of the Moon" from The Terminal Illness EP (2011)
 Sixo - "Government Bonds" from Free Floating Rationales (2012)
 Sixo - "Dance with Stars" from Tracking Perception EP (2012)
 Bong-Ra - "Monolith", "Inspiration", "Trillion Nemesi" & "Pandora's Box" from Monolith (2012)

Tracks appear on
 "Rainmen", "Savior?", "Human Races the Tortoise", "Martyr Theme Song" & "Holy Shit!" on Music for the Advancement of Hip Hop (1999)
 "Props 2000" on Strictly Indee (2000)
 "We Ain't Fessin'", "Silence (Poor Me Pt. 7)" & "A.D.D." on Giga Single (2001)
 "Shoot the Messenger", "Bottle of Humans", "Salt on Everything" & "Dumb This Down" on Anticon Label Sampler: 1999-2004 (2004)
 "The Great Deluge" & "Fukushima Tokyo Electric Russian Roulette" on J-A-P-A-N: A Fake Four Inc. Japan Relief Benefit EP (2011)

References

Discographies of American artists